South Shore Football Club was an English football club based in the South Shore area of Blackpool.

History
South Shore Football Club was founded as (Blackpool) South Shore in 1879. After entering the 1882-83 FA Cup and reaching the quarterfinals of the 1885-86 FA Cup, South Shore joined the Combination in 1888. While the Combination was intended to be an alternative for teams not admitted to the Football League, poor management and other issues saw the league collapse before the end of its first season. 

During their lone season in the Combination, the club travelled to Chatham Town for the first round of the FA Cup. However, Chatham Town's ground at the time was an open field with no facilities to take admissions, meaning there would be no revenue to cover South Shore's travel costs. Following the 2-1 loss, South Shore filed a complaint with the Lancashire County Football Association, which would eventually lead to the Football Association changing the FA Cup eligibility rules to require clubs to play in an enclosed ground.

Following the conclusion of the Football League's first season in 1889, a re-election process was held for the four worst-performing teams - Burnley, Derby County, Notts County, and Stoke City. While South Shore filed for election to the League, the bid received no votes and Burnley, Derby, Notts County, and Stoke were all re-elected. While most other unsuccessful applicants joined the Football Alliance, South Shore chose to remain unaffiliated for the 1889-90 season. This led to the rise of the recently formed Blackpool as the town's primary football club. South Shore would join Blackpool in the Lancashire League ahead of the 1891-92 season.

Prior the 1896-97 season, Blackpool applied for Football League membership and, prior to the vote, an agreement was made by the two clubs to amalgamate if Blackpool were successful. However, after Blackpool were voted into the League, South Shore pulled out of the deal. South Shore remained in the Lancashire League while Blackpool played three seasons in the Football League Second Division before losing a re-election vote following the 1898-99 season.

Both clubs began the 1899-1900 season in the Lancashire League. On 9 December, an agreement was reached following a match between the two sides where Blackpool would absorb South Shore. South Shore's record for the season was subsequently expunged.

Attempted revival 
In May 2021, it was reported that South Shore was being reformed as a phoenix club, and its prospective chairman stated his aim for the club to play in the West Lancashire League as early as 2022. However, South Shore Football Club Ltd, the company behind the phoenix club, filed to be struck from the Companies House register in April 2022.

Ground
The club initially played on a ground off Lytham Avenue, before later moving to Cow Gap Lane. A 300-seat stand was erected, although the remainder of the ground was largely undeveloped. In October 1899, South Shore moved to Bloomfield Road, which became the home ground of Blackpool FC after the two clubs merged in December of that year.

References 

Defunct football clubs in England
The Combination
Lancashire League (football)
Blackpool F.C.
Association football clubs established in 1879
1879 establishments in England
Association football clubs disestablished in 1899
1899 disestablishments in England
Sport in Blackpool
Defunct football clubs in Lancashire